Adjutant Paul Hamot was a French World War I flying ace credited with five aerial victories.

Biography
See also Aerial victory standards of World War I

Paul Hamot was born in Montherlant, France, on 30 September 1891. His initial military service was with an artillery regiment. He was severely wounded in action. Upon recovery, he was selected for pilot training in January 1916. On 16 June, he received his Military Pilot's Brevet, No. 3686, upon graduating training. He joined Escadrille Spa49 on 16 October 1917. 

Hamot teamed with Jean Bouyer to shoot down four German airplanes--a German scout on 18 May 1918, a two-seater on 8 July, and a pair of Albatroses on the 19th. On 1 August 1918, Hamot was promoted to Adjutant. Alexandre Bretillon joined Hamot and Bouyer in shooting down a two-seater on 21 October 1918 for Hamot's fifth victory.

Paul Hamot earned the Legion d'honneur, Médaille Militaire , and the Croix de Guerre with a minimum of three palms.

Paul Hamot died in Cannes, France, on 18 October 1956.

Sources of information

Reference 
 Franks, Norman; Bailey, Frank (1993). Over the Front: The Complete Record of the Fighter Aces and Units of the United States and French Air Services, 1914–1918 London, UK: Grub Street Publishing. .

1891 births
1956 deaths
French World War I flying aces